Willow Grove Inn (officially known as The Inn at Willow Grove) is a hotel in Orange, Virginia, United States.

The basic structure of the building was built by Joseph Clark in 1778. In 1820, his son added a brick wing.

The exterior of the building reflects Thomas Jefferson's Classical Revival architecture, but the interior reflects Federal-style architecture.

The Inn at Willow Grove has also been a member of Historic Hotels of America, the official program of the National Trust for Historic Preservation, since 2017.

See also
 List of Historic Hotels of America

References

External links
Official site
Willow Grove

Hotels in Virginia
Historic Hotels of America